T71 Dudelange is a professional basketball club based in Dudelange, Luxembourg. Established in 1954, the club plays in the Total League, the highest tier of Luxembourgian basketball. The club has won the national championships thirteen times, third most after Etzella and Nitia.

History 

The roots of T71 go back to 1954 at which time, at the initiative of the local CA Dudelange (track & field), some basketball fans founded a basketball section. In 1959 the basketball section separates from the CAD and joins the HB Dudelange (handball) club. In 1968, the basketball section becomes an independent entity within the HBD organization.

Since 1971, T71 has had a lot of success and celebrated 12 championships and 11 cup wins with its men team. The ladies won the championship and the cup competition twice. Both teams play in the highest division in the Total League.

Success

Men 
Total League
Winners (13): 1975, 1976, 1977, 1982, 1983, 1984, 1985, 2010, 2011, 2013, 2014, 2015, 2021
Luxembourg Cup
Winners (12): 1974, 1975, 1977, 1983, 1984, 1988, 1989, 2009, 2012, 2013, 2014, 2016

Women 
2x champion: 2003, 2009
2x cup winner: 2011, 2014

External links 
 Website
 Facebook profile

Basketball teams established in 1968
Basketball teams in Luxembourg